1941 in professional wrestling describes the year's events in the world of professional wrestling.

List of notable promotions 
Only one promotion held notable shows in 1941.

Calendar of notable shows

Championship changes

EMLL

Debuts
Debut date uncertain:
Yukon Eric

Births
Date of birth uncertain:
Jarochita Rivero(died in 2006)
Rocket Monroe(died in 2010) 
January 11   Abdullah the Butcher
January 19  Pat Patterson(died in 2020)
January 21  Ivan Putski
January 22  Tony Parisi(died in 2000)
January 24:
Teruo Takahashi
Klaus Kauroff (died in 2020) 
February 3  Dory Funk Jr.
March 2  Charlie Cook (died in 2020)  
April 11 - Buddy Wolfe (died in 2017) 
May 16  Johnny Rodz
May 18  Gino Brito
June 8  Paul Peller 
June 29  Johnny Saint
June 30  Rusher Kimura(died in 2010)
July 5  Little Tokyo(died in 2011)
July 8  Thunderbolt Patterson
July 8  Jerry Valiant (died in 2010) 
July 20 - Don Chuy (died in 2014) 
July 25 - Norman Frederick Charles III (died in 2019) 
September 15 - Verne Langdon (died in 2011) 
September 21  Jack Brisco(died in 2010)
October 15 - John Quinn (died in 2019)
October 16 - Bob Leonard (died in 2016)
October 19  Peter Thornley
October 30 - Kotetsu Yamamoto (died in 2010)

Deaths
January 31  Alfred Albert Joe de Re la Gardiur (59) 
October 12  Buddy O'Brien (31)

References

 
professional wrestling